Tiberiu Bone (13 April 1929 – 22 March 1983) was a Romanian footballer who played as a midfielder, most notably for Steaua București. He won 12 caps for Romania between 1951 and 1961. He was also part of Romania's squad for the 1952 Summer Olympics, but he did not play in any matches.

Honours

Club

Steaua București
Liga I (6):  1951, 1952, 1953, 1956, 1960, 1961
Cupa României (4): 1950, 1951, 1952, 1955

References

External links 

1929 births
1983 deaths
Sportspeople from Oradea
Romanian footballers
Romania international footballers
Liga I players
Stăruința Oradea players
CA Oradea players
CSM Jiul Petroșani players
FC Steaua București players
Olympic footballers of Romania
Footballers at the 1952 Summer Olympics
Association football midfielders